WMVV (90.7 FM) is a Christian radio station licensed to Griffin, Georgia, and serving the areas of Griffin, Forsyth, and Covington, as well as Southern and Eastern metro Atlanta.  The station is owned by Life Radio Ministries. WMVV is simulcast on 91.7 WMVW in Peachtree City, Georgia.

WMVV airs a format consisting of Christian talk and teaching programs as well as Christian Music. Christian Talk and Teaching programs heard on WMVV include Running to Win with Erwin Lutzer, Turning Point with David Jeremiah, Focus On The Family, and Revive Our Hearts with Nancy DeMoss Wolgemuth.

References

External links
WMVV's official website

Radio stations established in 1995
1995 establishments in Georgia (U.S. state)
Griffin, Georgia
MVV